Hypatima melanocharis is a moth in the family Gelechiidae. It was described by Edward Meyrick in 1934. It is found on Java in Indonesia.

References

Hypatima
Taxa named by Edward Meyrick
Moths described in 1934